James M. Coen (September 5, 1849 - April 1934) was a farmer and a Democratic member of the Mississippi State Senate, representing the state's 11th district, from 1916 to 1920.

Biography 
James M. Coen was born on September 5, 1849, in Linden, Copiah County, Mississippi. He was a member of the Confederate Army in the Cavalry during the Civil War until he was paroled by the Mississippi government in 1864. After the war ended, he returned to farming. During Reconstruction, he was a member of the Ku Klux Klan. From 1885 to 1891, he was the Justice of the Peace in his district for three terms. In 1915, he was elected to the Mississippi State Senate to represent the state's 11th District, composed of Copiah County, as a Democrat. He served in the term from 1916 to 1920. He died after a long illness in his son Claude's house in Gallatin, near Hazlehurst, in early April 1934. He was one of the last living Civil War veterans in that county. His funeral service was on April 2, and he was buried on April 3.

Personal life 
He was a member of the Methodist Church. He married Carrie M. Segrist in 1881. Coen had three children, Claude C. Coen, Herman Coen, and Flossie (Coen) Wyatt, as well as three stepdaughters.

References 

1849 births
1934 deaths
Confederate States Army soldiers
Democratic Party Mississippi state senators
American Ku Klux Klan members
People from Copiah County, Mississippi